Victoria is a small city in South Texas  and county seat of Victoria County, Texas. The population was 65,534 as of the 2020 census. The three counties of the Victoria Metropolitan Statistical Area had a population of 111,163 as of the 2000 census.

Victoria is located 30 miles inland from the Gulf of Mexico. Victoria is a two-hour drive from Corpus Christi, Houston, San Antonio, and Austin.

Victoria is named for General Guadalupe Victoria, who became the first president of independent Mexico.  Victoria is the cathedral city of the Roman Catholic Diocese of Victoria in Texas.

History

The city of Guadalupe Victoria was founded in 1824 by Martín De León, a Mexican empresario, in honor of Guadalupe Victoria, the first President of the Republic of Mexico. Victoria was initially part of De León's Colony, which had been founded that same year. By 1834, the town had a population of approximately 300.

During the Texas Revolution, Guadalupe Victoria contributed soldiers and supplies to pro-revolutionary forces. However, after James Fannin was defeated by the Mexican army at the Battle of Coleto, the town was occupied by Mexican forces. After Santa Anna was defeated at the Battle of San Jacinto, the town's Mexican residents were driven out by Anglo settlers, who renamed it Victoria.

In 1840, a Comanche raid on nearby Linnville killed many residents of the town. A cholera outbreak occurred in 1846.

During the mid-19th century, the city developed a large population of European immigrants, particularly Germans.  By the turn of the 20th century, Victoria was experiencing rapid population growth thanks to its position as a regional trade center. The city's advantageous proximity to Gulf Coast ports, the larger cities of San Antonio, Austin, and Corpus Christi, and prosperous industries in agriculture and petrochemicals solidified its prominence.

The University of Houston–Victoria was founded in 1971 and remains there today.

Geography
It lies along and just to the east of the Guadalupe River. Most of the city is underlain by smectite-rich clay which is locally capped by silt or fine sand; the high shrink-swell potential associated with smectite creates major challenges to urban infrastructure. Vegetation in better-drained areas consists primarily of short grasses with post oaks and other small timber and brush. Moist sites can grow tall forests dominated by elm and pecan.

Climate
Victoria is classified as having a humid subtropical climate. June through August is very hot and humid with high temperatures regularly exceeding . Spring and autumn are generally mild to warm with lower humidity. Winters are mild with occasional cold spells. Snow is very infrequent, usually occurring on average once every 11 years. On December 24–25, 2004, Victoria recorded its first White Christmas ever when  of snow fell.

Average monthly precipitation is lowest in winter and has a secondary minimum in August, with intense heat and humidity prevailing. On average, the wettest months are May, June, September and October (the last two of these due to significant threat from tropical weather systems, including hurricanes, which can produce torrential rainfalls some years).

Victoria has occasional severe weather, mostly from flooding. Hurricanes have the potential to bring severe damage to the area. Hurricane Claudette in July 2003 was the last hurricane to score a direct hit on the city. The most intense hurricane to affect Victoria remains Hurricane Carla in September 1961.

In May 2013, a rare tornado hit Victoria on a Saturday afternoon with tornado warnings everywhere from Corpus Christi to the southeast Houston/Sugarland Metro area. A short-lived tornado took a swipe at an open field northeast of Victoria, dodging all structures and causing no injuries but kicking up dirt and debris visible for miles. Tornadoes striking the area are commonly associated with hurricanes and are otherwise rare. https://www.victoriaadvocate.com/news/2013/may/26/ew_tornado_052613_210572/

Demographics

As of the 2020 United States census, there were 65,534 people, 23,724 households, and 15,560 families residing in the city. As of census of 2000, 60,603 people, 22,129 households, and 15,755 families resided in the city. The population density was 1,838.3 people per square mile (709.7/km). There were 24,192 housing units at an average density of 733.8 per square mile (283.3/km). The racial makeup of the city was 55.2% White, Hispanic or Latino of any race were 42.4% of the population, 7.59% African American, 0.51% Native American, 1.01% Asian, 0.04% Pacific Islander, 17.31% from other races, and 2.35% from two or more races.

Of the 22,129 households, 36.1% had children under the age of 18 living with them, 52.4% were married couples living together, 14.3% had a female householder with no husband present, and 28.8% were not families. About 24.5% of all households were made up of an individual, and 10.0% had someone living alone who was 65 years of age or older. The average household size was 2.68 and the average family size was 3.21.

In the city, the population was distributed as 28.8% under the age of 18, 9.7% from 18 to 24, 28.0% from 25 to 44, 21.0% from 45 to 64, and 12.6% who were 65 years of age or older. The median age was 34 years. For every 100 females, there were 92.6 males. For every 100 females age 18 and over, there were 88.8 males.

The median income for a household in the city was $36,829, and for a family was $42,866. Males had a median income of $34,184 versus $21,161 for females. The per capita income for the city was $19,009. About 12.2% of families and 14.7% of the population were below the poverty line, including 20.4% of those under the age of 18 and 12.2% ages 65 or older.

Governance
Victoria is administered by a city council of seven members. The council is composed of six council members and an elected mayor, accompanied by a hired city manager under the manager-council system of municipal governance.  The council is elected under four single-member districts (numbered 1 through 4), two "super districts" (numbered 5 and 6; Super District 5 overlays Districts 1 and 2 while Super District 6 overlays Districts 3 and 4); the mayor is elected at-large.

Victoria also serves as the county seat of Victoria County.

Education
The Victoria Independent School District serves the city.  Victoria has several private education options including Trinity Episcopal School, Faith Academy, Northside Baptist School, Our Lady of Victory School, Nazareth Academy, and St. Joseph High School.

Victoria College, a two-year community college, and the University of Houston–Victoria, a separate independent four-year campus of the University of Houston System, provide post-secondary educational opportunities.

Economy
Victoria's economy is a mix of education, health, retail, agriculture, and industry. Its access to major highways, the Victoria Regional Airport, railway terminals, the shallow draft Port of Victoria, and the deep water Port of Port Lavaca-Point Comfort help to sustain a healthy environment for business.  Major industrial employers in the region include Formosa Plastics Corp, Inteplast Group, Dow, Invista, Caterpillar and Alcoa.

Arts and culture
Victoria has many performing arts and theatre events and venues.  Theatre Victoria offers six productions in a season that runs from July to May.  Performances are held in the newly renovated Leo J. Welder Center, a fully equipped, modern performing space located downtown.  The Victoria Symphony Orchestra and Victoria Ballet provide several performances each year.

For a week each June, the Victoria Bach Festival welcomes musicians from across the country to fill theatres, churches, and outdoor spaces with engaging musical performances.

Several museums are located in Victoria. They include the McNamara House (a social history museum), the Nave (art), the Children's Discovery Museum, and the Museum of the Coastal Bend (MCB).  The MCB showcases the rich multicultural heritage of the region, and includes prominent displays of artifacts found from La Salle's colony in the late 17th century.

The Victoria Art League is home to many local artists and is located in one of the Texas Registered Historical Landmark buildings at 905 S. Bridge Street. The building was built in 1898 and has been the home of the Victoria Art League since 1999. The Victoria Art League is the only visual arts organization in Victoria.

Presidio La Bahia and Mission Espiritu Santo are located a short 30-minute drive from Victoria.  La Bahia is the best-preserved Spanish presidio in the United States, and Espiritu Santo is an excellent example of an early Spanish colonial church and mission.

Recreation
Victoria's 562-acre (2.27-km2) Riverside Park is home to the Texas Zoo, which houses more than 200 species of animals and plants indigenous to Texas, exhibiting them in their natural habitats. The park is also home to more than 15 baseball fields which are occupied during the spring and summer by teams from the Victoria Metro region. Also in Riverside Park on the Guadalupe River is the Victoria Paddling trail. This 4.2-mile stretch of the Guadalupe River is bordered by soft banks rather than the limestone bluffs of the Hill Country.

Boating and freshwater fishing are available at two area reservoirs, Lake Texana and Coleto Lake.  Many residents also take advantage of the nearby Gulf of Mexico.  Port O'Connor, 50 miles to the southeast, is renowned for bay, off-shore and wade fishing.

Three golf courses are located in Victoria: the Victoria Country Club, Riverside Golf Course, and Colony Creek Country Club.

The major shopping center is Victoria Mall.

Sports
The UHV Jaguars compete in baseball, softball, soccer, and golf as a member of the Red River Athletic Conference in the National Association of Intercollegiate Athletics (NAIA) Division I.

The Victoria Generals compete in the Texas Collegiate League, a summer baseball league.  The Generals won the 2010 TCL championship.

Media

Newspapers
The daily newspaper is The Victoria Advocate. Additionally, the University of Houston–Victoria publishes The Flame.

Radio

Television
KMOL-LD (channel 17) is Victoria's NBC affiliate, carrying Movies! on 17.2; it is owned and operated by Morgan Murphy Media.

KVCT (channel 19) is Victoria's Fox affiliate, simulcasting Telemundo on 19.2; carrying The CW Plus on 19.3 and This TV on 19.4; it is owned by SagamoreHill Broadcasting and operated by Morgan Murphy Media.

KUNU-LD (channel 21) is Victoria's Univision affiliate, carrying Dabl on 21.2; it is owned and operated by Morgan Murphy Media.

KAVU-TV (channel 25) is Victoria's ABC affiliate, simulcasting NBC on 25.2 and CBS on 25.3; carrying AccuWeather on 25.4 and Ion Television on 25.5; it is owned and operated by Morgan Murphy Media.

KQZY-LD (channel 33) is Victoria's Cozi TV affiliate, carrying MeTV on 33.2; it is owned and operated by Morgan Murphy Media.

KXTS-LD (channel 41) is Victoria's CBS affiliate, carrying Antenna TV on 41.2; it is owned and operated by Morgan Murphy Media.

KVTX-LD (channel 45) is Victoria's Telemundo affiliate; it is owned and operated by Morgan Murphy Media.

PBS programming is provided by KUHT (channel 8) in Houston and KLRN (channel 9) in San Antonio, which share the Victoria market.

Notable people

 Stone Cold Steve Austin (born 1964), wrestler, actor
 Cowboy Troy (Troy Lee Coleman III), singer
 Doug Drabek, former MLB pitcher, winner of 1990 Cy Young Award
 Kyle Drabek, former MLB pitcher
 Harvey Fite, sculptor, creator of Opus 40
 Ron Gant, former MLB outfielder
 Doug Hazlewood, comic book creator
 Bruce Herron, former NFL linebacker
 Edward F. Knipling, entomologist
 Kevin Kolb, former NFL quarterback
 Michale Kyser (born 1991), basketball player for Hapoel Holon in the Israeli Basketball Premier League
 Leo N. Levi (1856–1904), lawyer
 Doug Mellard, stand-up comedian
 Frankie Miller (born 1931), country musician
 Royston Nave (1886–1931), artist
 Ben Price, videographer, sound technician, and drummer
 Matt Prokop (born 1990), actor 
 Joseph Rojas, lead singer of Seventh Day Slumber
 Jerheme Urban, former NFL wide receiver
 Noël Wells (born 1986), actress
 Bailey Zappe NFL Quarterback for the New England Patriots

Points of interest

DeLeon Plaza and Bandstand, originally known as 'Plaza de la Constitucion', was one of four public squares set aside by colony founder Martin de Leon. The plaza is filled with local monuments and memorials, shade trees, a bandstand built in 1890, and information about the six flags over Texas.

The Victoria County Courthouse, located at Bridge and Constitution Streets, was built in 1892 in Romanesque architecture by James R. Gordan in the style of Henry Richardson. The structure is made of Texas granite and Indiana limestone.

Fossati's Delicatessen is located in downtown Victoria, it was opened in 1882 by Italian immigrant Fraschio ("Frank") Napoleon Fossati.  After 125 years, Fossati's is still owned and operated by the same family.

The Rosebud Fountain and Grill downtown is a restoration of the diner atmosphere popular in the 1950s. The restaurant, located in a bright-red corner building at North Main and West Constitution Streets, has been featured in Bob Phillips' Texas Country Reporter syndicated television series.

Downtown Victoria has the second-oldest Roman Catholic Church in Texas and first to be canonically established in the Republic of Texas, St. Mary's Church.

The Islamic Center of Victoria is a mosque in Victoria. It was burned down on January 28, 2017. By January 31, more than $950,000 had been raised to rebuild it. In June, 2017, a Texas man, named Marq Vincent Perez, was indicted on federal hate crime charges for the arson attack on the Islamic Center and mosque.

Transportation
Victoria is located at the intersection of three major U.S. highways:

 US Highway 59 (I-69 and I-69W) is a four-lane divided, interstate-quality highway extending southwest to Laredo and northeast to Houston, where it meets Interstate 10 and Interstate 45. It is also known as the Lloyd M. Bentsen Highway. US 59 is planned to be included within the future Interstate 69 from Victoria to Tenaha (once fully completed the mainline of Interstate 69 will travel from Brownsville, Texas to Port Huron, Michigan). US 59 is planned to be included within the future Interstate 69W from Victoria to Laredo.
 US Highway 77 (I-69E) travels north from Victoria to the Dallas–Fort Worth metroplex, intersecting Interstate 10, Interstate 35 and Interstate 37. US 77 travels south via a four-lane divided highway to the Rio Grande Valley. US 77 is planned to be included within the future Interstate 69E from Victoria to Brownsville.
 US Highway 87 travels northwest connecting Victoria to San Antonio, providing access to Interstate 35.  US 87 also connects with Port Lavaca to the southeast.

Victoria is a regional transportation hub for the surrounding counties, with local access to major large and small freight carriers, Victoria Regional Airport, railway terminals, the shallow draft Port of Victoria and the deep water Port of Port Lavaca – Point Comfort.

In 2002, Victoria Transit began operation of a citywide transportation system.  It currently offers bus service on four fixed routes consisting of 70 stops.

Gallery

References

External links 

 

 
Cities in Texas
County seats in Texas
Populated places on the Guadalupe River (Texas)
Victoria, Texas metropolitan area
Capitals of former nations
Cities in Victoria County, Texas